Michael Cholbi (born 1972) is an American philosopher and Chair in Philosophy at the University of Edinburgh. He is best known for his research on ethical issues related to death and dying, including suicide, grief, and immortality. Cholbi has also published work in moral psychology and Kantian ethics, as well as on topics in practical ethics such as work and labor, punishment, and paternalism.

Life and Career
Cholbi was born 1972 in Portland, Oregon. He intended to pursue a career in journalism before being exposed to Enlightenment thought in his first philosophy course. 
He received his B.A. from Swarthmore College in 1994 and obtained his Ph.D from the University of Virginia in 1999, completing a dissertation entitled “Publicity and Practical Reason.” After spending three years as an assistant professor at Brooklyn College, City University of New York, he went on to become Professor of Philosophy and director of the California Center for Ethics and Policy (CCEP) at California State Polytechnic University in Pomona, California. In January 2020, he joined the University of Edinburgh. 

Cholbi was previously the editor of the journal Teaching Philosophy and currently serves as an associate editor for Ethical Theory and Moral Practice and on the editorial boards of the Journal of Applied Philosophy and Social Theory and Practice. In 2012, he founded the International Association for the Philosophy of Death and Dying (IAPDD). 

Cholbi appeared as a contestant on Jeopardy! in 2007, finishing second.

Books
Suicide: The Philosophical Dimensions, Broadview, 2011
Understanding Kant’s Ethics, Cambridge University Press, 2016
Grief: A Philosophical Guide, Princeton University Press, 2021
edited
Immortality and the Philosophy of Death, Rowman and Littlefield, 2015
New Directions in the Ethics of Assisted Suicide and Euthanasia. Springer, 2015 (with Jukka Varelius)
Euthanasia and Assisted Suicide: Global Views on Choosing to End Life. Praeger, 2017
Procreation, Parenthood, and Educational Rights, Routledge, 2017 (with Jaime Ahlberg)
The Future of Work, Technology, and Basic Income, Routledge, 2019 (with M.E. Weber)
The Movement for Black Lives: Philosophical Perspectives, Oxford University Press, 2020 (with B. Hogan, A. Madva, and B. Yost)
Exploring the Philosophy of Death and Dying: Classic and Contemporary Perspectives, Routledge, 2020 (with T. Timmerman)

References

External links

Cholbi's personal website

21st-century American philosophers
Philosophy academics
Academics of the University of Edinburgh
University of Virginia alumni
California State Polytechnic University, Pomona faculty
Brooklyn College faculty
Labor studies scholars
Philosophy journal editors
Suicidologists
Kant scholars
Publons awards recipients

Living people
1972 births

Educators from Portland, Oregon